Eduin Ujka (born 10 April 1995 in Laç) is an Albanian footballer who most recently played as a goalkeeper for Iliria Fushë-Krujë in the Albanian First Division.

Honours

Club
Laçi
 Albanian Cup (1): 2012–13
 Albanian Supercup (1): 2015

References

1995 births
Living people
People from Laç
Association football goalkeepers
Albanian footballers
KF Laçi players
FC Kamza players
KF Tërbuni Pukë players
KS Iliria players
Kategoria Superiore players
Kategoria e Parë players